Ojaq Qeshlaq may refer to:
 Ojaq Qeshlaq-e Khoruslu
 Qeshlaq-e Khan Owghlan
 Ojaq Qeshlaqi